The Germany national handball team is one of the most successful handball teams in the world, having won three World Championships and two European Championship.

Honours

Competitive record
For  East Germany team record, look here.

Olympic Games

World Championship

European Championship

*Denotes draws include knockout matches decided in a penalty shootout.
**Gold background color indicates that the tournament was won. Red border color indicates tournament was held on home soil.

Team

Current squad
Squad for the 2023 World Men's Handball Championship

Head coach:  Alfreð Gíslason

History of coaches
 1925–1933Carl Schelenz
 1934–1939Otto Günther Kaundinya
 1940–1945Carl Schelenz
 1946–1955Fritz Fromm
 1955–1972Werner Vick
 1972–1974Horst Käsler
 1974–1982Vlado Stenzel
 1982–1987Simon Schobel
 1987–1989Petre Ivănescu
 1989–1992Horst Bredemeier
 1992–1993Armin Emrich
 1993–1996Arno Ehret
 1997–2011Heiner Brand
 2011–2014Martin Heuberger
 2014–2017Dagur Sigurðsson
 2017–2020Christian Prokop
 2020–presentAlfreð Gíslason

References

External links

IHF profile

Men's national handball teams
Handball in Germany
Handball
Recipients of the Silver Laurel Leaf